Walter Hudd (20 February 1897 – 20 January 1963) was a British actor and director.

Stage career
Hudd made his stage debut in The Manxman in 1919, and later toured as part of the Fred Terry Company; first attracting serious attention playing Guildenstern in a 1925 modern dress Hamlet. He also later directed plays at Stratford-on-Avon, including Richard II, Twelfth Night (also appearing as Malvolio) and Doctor Faustus (all 1947).

His West End appearances included The Way Things Happen (Ambassadors Theatre 1923), The Ghost Train (Prince of Wales Theatre 1925), The Grain of Mustard Seed (Ambassadors Theatre 1930), Geneva (Saville Theatre 1938), Thunder Rock (St Martin's Theatre 1941), A Month in the Country (New Theatre 1949), The Waltz of the Toreadors (Criterion Theatre 1956) and The Potting Shed (Globe Theatre 1958).

He made his sole Broadway appearance in the Theatre Guild revival of You Never Can Tell (Martin Beck Theatre 1948). He was also a member of the Malvern Festival, Stratford Memorial and Old Vic theatre companies, and in later life became Head of Drama at the Central School of Speech and Drama.

Film career
His film career began in 1935 with Anthony Asquith's Moscow Nights. The following year he was cast as T.E. Lawrence (Lawrence of Arabia) in Alexander Korda's proposed biopic of the celebrated soldier/author, but the production was abandoned. He had previously played a character based on Lawrence in Bernard Shaw's play, Too True to be Good, a performance that had been highly praised by Lawrence himself.

His last two films, The Punch and Judy Man and It's All Happening, were released posthumously.

Filmography

 Moscow Nights (1935) as The Doctor
 Rembrandt (1936) as Capt. Banning Cocq
 Elephant Boy (1937) as Petersen
 Housemaster (1938) as Frank Hastings
 Black Limelight (1939) as Lawrence Crawford
 The Outsider (1939) as Dr. Helmore
 Dead Man's Shoes (1940) as Gaston Alexandri
 Dr. O'Dowd (1940) as Dr. Crowther
 Major Barbara (1941) as Stephen Undershaft
 Uncensored (1942) as Van Heemskirk
 Love Story (1944) as Ray
 I Live in Grosvenor Square (1945) as Vicar
 I Know Where I'm Going! (1945) as Hunter
 Escape (1948) as Defence Counsel
 Paper Orchid (1949) as Briggs
 Landfall (1949) as Professor Legge
 The Importance of Being Earnest (1952) as Lane
 Cosh Boy (1953) as Magistrate (uncredited)
 The Good Die Young (1954) as Dr. Reed
 Cast a Dark Shadow (1955) as The Coroner
 The Adventures of Robin Hood (1956, TV) as The Judge
 Reach for the Sky (1956) as Air Vice-Marshal Halahan
 Satellite in the Sky (1956) as Blandford
 The Last Man to Hang? (1956) as The Judge
 Loser Takes All (1956) as Arnold (uncredited)
 The Man Upstairs (1958) as The Superintendent
 Further Up the Creek (1958) as Consul
 The Two-Headed Spy (1958) as Adm. Canaris
 The Navy Lark (1959) as Naval Captain
 Look Back in Anger (1959) as Actor
 Two-Way Stretch (1960) as Rev. Patterson
 Sink the Bismarck! (1960) as Admiral (HMS Hood)
 The Prince and the Pauper (1962, TV) as Archbishop of Canterbury
 Life for Ruth (1962) as Judge
 The Punch and Judy Man (1963) as Clergyman
 It's All Happening (1963) as J.B. Magdeburg

References

External links

1897 births
1963 deaths
English male stage actors
English male film actors
English male television actors
20th-century English male actors